Alien Earth, set in a post-apocalyptic timeline, is an isometric pseudo-3D action-adventure game for Windows. It has RPG elements, including dialogue trees, so it can also be called an action role-playing game, but it uses resource management as puzzles, requiring the player to combine items in order to advance in the game. It was created by Krome Studios Melbourne, in 1998, when they were called Beam Software Pty. Ltd.

Plot
What remains of Earth and most of its inhabitants after a nuclear holocaust is dominated and enslaved by the insect-like humanoid Raksha, invaders from another planet. Many years later, only the Resistance remains free, in the sewers of a ruined city. The player takes control of Finn, a villager in a jungle that the Raksha use to hunt their slaves as prey. A Raksha hunting lord marks Finn as a troublemaker, and he must outwit the Raksha, and seek aid wherever he can find it, to survive. His nemesis vanquished, Finn searches for answers about the fate of his civilization in a wartorn city, despite the Scavengers hunting through the ruins for scraps of remaining technology...and intruders.

Gameplay
Resource management is a key part of the game; items are collected, as in most games, but also combined; the latter is crucial to completing the game. Combining a wooden pole with a metallic blade forms a Spear, for example, or an empty bottle, petrol and a rag cloth to form a molotov cocktail. Separate NPCs make scavenged Raksha weapons usable and sellable, and level up Finn's psionic abilities. Finn's fighting abilities use a skill levelling system; the more Finn uses a weapon, the better he gets at using it.

List of characters
Finn: the playable character, and one of the few characters that have psionic abilities.
Old Jack: Like Finn, once hunted by the Raksha, and from the same village. He aids Finn with his knowledge of the jungle, its inhabitants, and herb lore.
Charlie: Crazy Charlie may be just crazy, or one of the test subjects the Raksha used to develop Psionic powers. Charlie is devoted to his plastic parrot...until Finn gives him a worn teddy bear. 
Rob: The chief in the village where Finn lived in. Believes the Raksha to be gods.
Brock: Lives in an old movie theater. Pale and skinny and very frightened about most things, he tells Finn of The Resistance. 
Colonel: He stands guard over a bunker in the ruined city, as his parents did before him.
Karl: The short tempered but strong willed leader of The Resistance, he gives missions to Finn so he can help The Resistance against the Raksha. 
Roscko: The Resistance weapons specialist. Removes the identity tags from Raksha weapons so that they can be used or sold. 
Harry: A fat junkman that works in the Resistance, and will buy items from Finn.
Romuko: A young woman with psionic healing abilities that was found by The Resistance starved and weak. Now she works as a medic for The Resistance.

Beam Software 
Executive Producer: David Giles; Producers: Andrew Buttery, Michael Scott; Technical Director: Philip Mitchell; Design: Ian Malcolm; Based on Original Concept by: Adam Lancman; Lead Programmers: Darren Bremner, Stephen McNamara; Programmers: Adam Blanch, Aidan Doyle, Brian Post, Frank C. Prete, Eddit Retelj, Wayne Simmons, Ian Tran, Dan Walker; FMV Player: Adrian Thewlis; Motion Capture Coordinator: Gordon Lescinsky; Lead Artist: Holger Liebnitz; Key Artists: Heston Barber, Jeremy Kupsch, Adam Ryan; Artists: Grant Arthur, Damien Borg, Chris Jones, Russell Murchie, Dan Tonkin; Lead FMV/CG Sequence Artist: Chris Jones; FMV/CG Sequence Artists: Damien Borg, Simon Hart, Adam Ryan; Art Assistants: Nick Evans, Angie Kindred, Ciri Thompson; Renderfarm Coordinator: Tim Bos; Voice Talent: Michael Bishop, Don Bridges, Edwina Exton, Peter Farago, Andrew Goodun, Matt King, Kirsten O'Leary; Additional Voices: Shane Collier, Lucinda McKnight, Adam Ryan; Music: Gavin Parker, Marshall Parker; Lead Tester: Gary Ireland; Testers: Richard Allen, Richard Au, Tamzin Barber, Shane Collier, Asher Doig, Vito Trifilo; Hardware and Network Support: Gavan Anderson, Ryan Bessemer; Marketing: Kirsten Beamish; Internet Support: Adrian Giles 
Playmates Interactive Entertainment
VP Business Affairs and Product Development: Gary Rosenfeld; Co-Producers: Chris Archer, Andy Brown; Sr. VP of Sales: Bill Beebe; Marketing: Tom McClure; Packaging: Kathy Sison; Lead Tester: David Arranaga; Consumer Service: David Oniveros

Development
The game was showcased at E3 1997.

Reception
Next Generation reviewed the PC version of the game, rating it three stars out of five, and stated that "Well-designed and (mostly) well-implemented, it might not be flashy, but the game possesses a depth and quality that marks it as one of the brighter spots in the lineup this month."

Reviews
PC Zone #65 (1998 July)
Igromania #5, #8
Power Unlimited (Jul, 1998)
PC Player (Aug, 1998)
PC Games (Aug 05, 1998)

References 

1998 video games
Action-adventure games
Action role-playing video games
Post-apocalyptic video games
Science fiction video games
Single-player video games
Video games about extraterrestrial life
Video games with isometric graphics
Windows games
Windows-only games